Chorion-specific transcription factor GCMb is a protein that in humans is encoded by the GCM2 gene.

The Drosophila 'glial cells missing' (gcm) gene is thought to act as a binary switch between neuronal and glial cell determination. The gcm protein and mammalian gcm homologs contain a conserved N-terminal gcm motif that has DNA-binding activity. See GCM1 (MIM 603715).[supplied by OMIM]

References

Further reading